Alexander Hyatt King, also known as Alec Hyatt King, (18 July 1911, in Beckenham, London – 10 March 1995, in Southwold, Suffolk) was an English musicologist and bibliographer, who was a music librarian of the British Museum and leading scholar on Wolfgang Amadeus Mozart. Educated at Dulwich College and King's College, Cambridge, he began his career at the British Museum as a cataloguer in February 1934; a post he remained in until December 1944 when he succeeded William Charles Smith as Superintendent of the Music Room. He remained in that position until 1973 when he was named  Music Librarian of the Reference Division at the British Library. He also concurrently served as the British Museum's Deputy Keeper of the Department of Printed Books from 1959 until his retirement in 1976. He was involved in the early days of the British Institute of Recorded Sound: as Chairman in 1952 he helped find accommodation for the collection within the British Museum.

Hyatt King married art historian Evelyn Davies in 1943 and there were two sons. In the 1950s, they were living at 19, Rudall Crescent, London, NW3. He moved to Southwold in Suffolk for his final years and is buried in Reydon churchyard.

Selected bibliography
See  for a complete bibliography

References

1911 births
1995 deaths
Alumni of King's College, Cambridge
Employees of the British Library
Employees of the British Museum
English musicologists
Librarians from London
People educated at Dulwich College
Mozart scholars
Music librarians